You Betta' Move Somethin'! is a studio album released by the Washington, D.C.-based go-go band the Huck-A-Bucks on April 15, 1997. The album consist of ten tracks including the single "Bomp Bomp (You Betta' Move Somethin'!)".

Track listing

Personnel
Adapted from AllMusic.

Sequan Jones – congas, timbales
A.J. Mezikpih – rapping, vocals
Lamont Ray – percussion, vocals
Felix Stevenson – drums
Joseph Timms – vocals
Charles Yancy – percussion, vocals
Roy Battle – engineer, mixing, producer
Walt Fletcher – assistant engineer

References

1997 albums
Huck-A-Bucks albums